Deliçay (literally 'crazy creek', also called Selindi) is a creek in Mersin Province, Turkey. In Turkish rivers with irregular flowrate are usually called Deliçay. But here it is a proper noun and it refers to its highly irregular flowrate.

The head waters are close to the village Değirmendere in Toros Mountains. In fact at this point the village and the river are named after each other. (Değirmendere means "mill river") But in the lower reaches it is called Deliçay. It flows by the villages of Çandır, Parmakkurdu and Hebilli.

In the past this river was called  Serince, Selinti and Anhiyaleos

References

Rivers of Turkey
Geography of Mersin Province